Havona may refer to:
Havona, a term in the Urantia Book
"Havona", a song by Weather Report from their 1977 album Heavy Weather